List of archaeological sites in County Londonderry, Northern Ireland:

 

A
Aghagaskin, Rath, grid ref: H8942 9315
Altaghoney, Cross, grid ref: C5371 0192
Altikeeragh, Rath, grid ref: C7551 3199
Altinure Upper, Rath, grid ref: C5951 0305
Annagh and Moneysterlin, Crannog at Loughinsholin, grid ref: H8475 9262
Artikelly, World War II training dome, grid ref: C6811 2511
Aughlish, Stone circles and alignments, grid ref: Area of C662 043

B
Ballindrum, Rath, grid ref: H8693 8207
Ballybriest, Wedge tomb (area surrounding the state care monument), grid ref: H7618 8845
Ballybriest, Dual court tomb, ‘Carnanbane’ (area surrounding the state care monument), grid ref: H7617 8857
Ballybriest, Wedge tomb, grid ref: H7642 8860
Ballybriest, Stone circle complex, grid ref: H7564 8899
Ballycairn, Motte and bailey, grid ref: C8350 3420
Ballydonegan, Sweat house, grid ref: C6276 0234
Ballyhacket Lisawilling, Mound, grid ref: C7501 3301
Ballyhacket Toberclaw, Rath, grid ref: C7523 3270
Ballyhanna, Round cairn, grid ref: C7012 2835
Ballyholly, Stone circle, alignment and megalithic tombs, grid ref: C5771 1178 
Ballykelly, Church, grid ref: C6225 2273
Ballykelly, Plantation village site: Walworth, grid ref: Area of C623 226
Ballymagrorty, Cairn with cist, grid ref: C3855 1697
Ballymagrorty or White House, Heavy Anti-Aircraft Battery, grid ref: C3967 1874
Ballymoney, Rath, grid ref: C7738 3413
Ballymully, Church, graveyard and enclosure: ‘Desertlyn church’, grid ref: H8414 8452
Ballymully, Wedge tomb, grid ref: H8472 8436
Ballymulderg Beg, Mound, grid ref: H9092 8690
Ballymultrea, Plantation castle, bawn and village site: Salterstown, grid ref: H9518 8236
Ballynacannon, Rath, grid ref: C8145 2597
Ballynagard, Light Anti-Aircraft Position, grid ref: C4655 2149
Ballynashallog, Neolithic settlement ‘Thornhill’, grid ref: C4594 2130
Ballyneill More, Rath, grid ref: H9282 8520
Ballyness, Bivallate rath, grid ref: C7722 1306
Ballyreagh, Flint scatter and occupation layer, grid ref: C8436 3987
Ballyrowan Beg, Counterscarp rath, grid ref: H9396 8490
Ballywildrick Lower, Standing stone, grid ref: C7811 3231
Ballywoolen, Prehistoric sandhills settlement site, C7818 3567
Ballywoolen, Mole (eastern), grid ref: C7817 3664
Beagh (Temporal), Mound, grid ref: C8596 0714
Belagherty, Bivallate rath, grid ref: H9356 8473
Bellury, Rath, grid ref: C8778 1523
Bolie, Rath, grid ref: C5886 1966
Bovevagh, Church, graveyard and tomb (area surrounding the State Care monument)
Boviel, Wedge tomb: Cloghagalla, grid ref: C7295 0779
Brockaghboy, Rath, grid ref: C8094 1259
Brockaghboy, Rath, grid ref: C8100 1253
Brockaghboy, Rath, grid ref: C8026 1220

C
Cabragh, Windmill: Knockcloghrim, grid ref: H8953 9694
Calmore, crannog, grid ref: NV975556
Camus, Cross and bullaun, grid ref: C8717 2897
Carn, Cashel, grid ref: C7568 0673
Carn, Wedge tomb, grid ref: C7328 0707
Carnalridge, Standing stone: the White Wife, grid ref: C8475 3872
Carnanbane, Court tomb, grid ref: C6709 0585
Carnanbane (on boundary with Magheramore), Stone cross (termon cross associated with Banagher Church, grid ref: C6746 0655
Carrick East, Central court tomb: ‘Stone circle’, grid ref: C7044 1738
Carrydarragh, Rath, grid ref: H8311 8420
Carrydoo, Rath, grid ref: C7205 2558
Cashel, Sweat house, grid ref: C8031 2451
Cashel, Rath: Black Fort, grid ref: C7178 0674
Cashel, Cashel and cairn: White Fort, grid ref: C7187 0679
Clagan, Standing stones (3), grid ref: C5823 0548
Claudy and Dungorkin, Earthwork, grid ref: C5500 0845
Clonmakane, Court tomb, grid ref: C5474 1555
Clooney (Derry), Chapel: St Columb's or St Brecan's, grid ref: C4425 1743
Clooney, Star fortification: Ebrington Barracks, grid ref: C4409 1696
Coolnasillagh, Stone circle and alignment, grid ref: C7846 0043
Coolsaragh, Rath: Drumbally Fort, grid ref: H8424 9363
Corick, Stone alignments and circle, grid ref:Area of H780 896
Craigmore, Rath, grid ref: C8482 0177
Cregg, Standing stone: the White Stone, grid ref: C5311 0797
Cregg, Counterscarp rath, grid ref: C5359 0681
Crevolea, Portal tomb: Grey Stone, grid ref: C8470 2335
Crossreagh East, Mole (eastern), grid ref: C7843 3640
Crockindollagh, Rath, grid ref: C8204 1903
Cuilbane, Stone circle or cairn: Tamney Cromlech, grid ref: C8304 1219
Culmore, Heavy Anti-Aircraft Battery, grid ref: C4736 2380
Culnagrew, Standing stone and burials, grid ref: C8671 0842

D
Deer Park, Castle (site): O’Cahan's Castle, grid ref: C6772 2039
Derry, Linear Cellars (East Wall), grid ref: Area of C436 167
Derry, 17th century windmill, grid ref: C4291 1616
Derrycrier, Standing stone, grid ref: C6703 0849
Doon, Rath, grid ref: H7616 9400
Downhill, Enclosure, grid ref: C7596 3504
Downhill, Church and graveyard: Dunboe, grid ref: C7582 3541
Dreenan, Rath, grid ref: C9139 0099
Drum, Drum Fort or Larry's Fort (area surrounding the state care monument), grid ref: C6546 1137
Drumadreen, Rath, grid ref: C6895 1570
Drumaduan, Rath, grid ref: C9083 2984
Drumard, Rath, grid ref: H8272 8400
Drumcovit, Rath: Tandragee Fort, grid ref: C6345 0501
Drumcovit, Standing stone, grid ref: C6335 0519
Drumderg, Portal tomb: Dergmore's Grave, grid ref: H7505 9597
Drummans Lower, Heavy Anti-Aircraft Battery, grid ref: C6447 3728
Dunbeg, Sweat house, grid ref: C7373 2660
Duncrun, Church site and cross-carved stone: Church Hill, grid ref: C6817 3237
Duncrun, Rath, grid ref: C6879 3209
Dunderg, Rath, grid ref: C8331 2941
Dunderg, Rath, grid ref: C8305 3010
Dunderg, Fundamental bench mark, grid ref: C8315 2939
Dungiven, Standing stone, grid ref: C6942 0844
Dungiven, Dungiven Castle: part of walls, grid ref: C6924 0907
Dungiven, Priory, manor house and bawn, grid ref: C6920 0826
Dunmore, Rath, grid ref: C7444 2694

E
Eden, Cashel, grid ref: C6040 0244
Elagh More, Doherty Tower or Castle Aileach, grid ref: C4158 2165
Ervey, Portal tomb (area surrounding the state care monument), grid ref: C5170 1260

F
Farrantemple Glebe, Bivallate rath: Farrantemple Fort, grid ref: C8193 1407
Faughanvale, Church, grid ref: C5793 2092
Fincarn, Standing stone, grid ref: C6441 0477
Freugh, Large enclosure: cashel, grid ref: C7793 1843
Fruithill, Drumachose Church, grid ref: C6930 2314

G
Gallany, Standing stone, grid ref: C6441 0477
Garvagh, Rath: Lisatinny, grid ref: C8385 1635
Glasakeeran, Wedge tomb: Giant's Grave, grid ref: C5708 1511
Glebe, Mound: Cashlandoo, grid ref: C8228 3632
Glebe (Ballywillin), Church, grid ref: C8705 3870
Gortacloghan, Rath, grid ref: C8396 1204
Gortica, Standing stone, grid ref: C4889 1462
Gortinure, Rath, grid ref: C4255 1175
Gortnamoyagh, Inauguration Stone: Giant's Track, Shane's Leap or St Adamnan’s Footprints, grid ref: Area of C8059 1497
Granaghan, Rath, grid ref: C8484 0650
Grange Beg, World War II Pillbox, DHP No 290, grid ref: C79237 35547
Grange More, Sand dune system with archaeology, grid refs: C8060 3540 and C8020 3510
Gulladuff, Rath, grid ref: C8952 0019

I
Inishrush, Crannog in Green Lough (area surrounding the state care monument), grid ref: C9370 0419
Intake, Church, graveyard and bullaun: Church Island, grid ref: H9752 9464

K
Keady, Cairn and enclosure, grid ref: C7250 2404
Keely, Barrow, grid ref: C8871 2271
Kilcaltan, Standing stone, grid ref: C5244 0812
Kilgort, Rath, grid ref: C5711 0277
Kilhoyle, Rath: King’s Fort, grid ref: C7431 1671
Kilhoyle, Wedge tomb, grid ref: C7531 1625
Kilhoyle, Possible cashel and souterrain (known as the Rhellick’ Killeen), grid ref: C73800 15980
Kiltest, Graveyard, grid ref: C7875 2238
Knockaduff, Burial Mound ‘Tappatowsie’, grid ref: C8749 2383
Knockoneill (Tamnybrack), Court tomb: Giant's Grave, grid ref: C8196 0875
Knockoneill (Tamnybrack), Rath, grid ref: C8204 0892

L
Lackagh, Stone circle, grid ref: C4778 0705
Lackagh, 4 cairns, grid ref: C4702 0590
Largantea, Wedge tomb, grid ref: C7264 2690
Learden, Long mound, ‘Piper’s Hill’, grid ref: C8173 2862
Leck, Rath, grid ref: C7359 2326
Lettermuck, Mound, grid ref: C5283 0641
Lisbunny, Rath, grid ref: C5295 0431
Lisgorgan Glebe, Rath, grid ref: C8921 0569
Lismoyle, Bivallate rath, grid ref: C8858 0904
Little Derry, Cairn: The Fairy Bush, Tassey's Hill, grid ref: C7218 2004
Lissaghmore, Plantation village site: Agivey, grid ref: Area of C902 226
Loughan Island, Fortifications: Inis an Loughan, grid ref: C8780 2775
Loughermore, Cup and ring marked stone, grid ref: C5842 1333
Loughtilube, Rath, grid ref: C5843 0333
Loughtilube, Standing stone, grid ref: C5822 0348

M
Macosquin, Plantation village
Magherafelt Town Parks, Multi-period church and graveyard, grid ref: H8975 9079
Magheramore, Rath and attached enclosure, grid ref: C8329 1209
Magheramore, Earthwork, grid ref: C8322 1476
Magheramore, Banagher old church (area surrounding state care monument) and cross, grid ref: C6755 0600
Magheramore, Court tomb and portal tomb (remains of): The Cove Stones, grid ref: C6853 0541
Managh Beg, Rath (Motte and bailey?), grid ref: C4768 1593
Mawillian, Rath: The Fort, grid ref: H8881 8262
Mayboy, Rath, grid ref: C8168 1963
Meavemanougher, Sweat house, grid ref: C8077 2196
Mill Loughan & Camus, Ford and associated earthwork, grid ref: C8756 2910
Mobuy, Standing stone and site of stone circle: Druid's Circle, grid ref: H7827 8591
Monehanegan, Barrow, grid ref: C5535 1605
Moneydig, Passage tomb: the Daff Stone, grid ref: C8893 1651
Moneyguiggy, Rath: White Fort, grid ref: H8127 9680
Moneyhoghan, Rath, grid ref: C6097 0246
Moneyhoghan, Cashel, grid ref: C6182 0336
Moneymore, Rath, grid ref: H8635 8334
Moneyneany, Rath, grid ref: H7522 9700
Moneyrannel, Rath: Rough Fort, grid ref: C6585 2303
Mormeal, Church and graveyard: Kilcronaghan Church, grid ref: H8151 9478
Mount Sandel, Mesolithic settlement site, grid ref: C8533 3076
Movanagher, Plantation castle and village site, grid ref: C9203 1589
Moygall, Barrow, grid ref: H8994 9973
Muff, Church gable: Eglinton Church, grid ref: C5295 2038
Muff, Plantation village site: Eglinton, grid ref: Area of C528 203
Mullaboy, Standing stone (area surrounding the state care monument), grid ref: C5158 1298
Mullaboy, Cross, grid ref: C5120 1393
Mullagh, Mound (possible assembly site): Daisy Hill, or Drumceatt, or the Mullagh, grid ref: C6665 2168
Mullaghacall South, Standing stone, grid ref: C8254 3732
Mullaghmore, Agivey Church, hole-stone and font, grid ref: C9032 2221

O
Owenbeg, 2 Standing stones, possibly remains of megalithic tomb, grid ref: C6716 0855

R
Rallagh, Rath, grid ref: C6668 0663

S
Sconce, Belgarrow and Knockmult, Rock fortification: Giant's Sconce, grid ref: C7724 2983
Shantallow, Inauguration stone (St Columb's Stone) at Belmont House Special School, grid ref: C4386 1934
Slaghtaverty, Cairn: Slaght Averty or Dwarf's Grave, grid ref: C8193 1325
Slaghtneill, Wedge tomb: Giant's Grave, grid ref: C8238 0611
Somerset & Mount Sandel, Tidal ford and Mesolithic material, grid ref: C8496 3111
Stradreagh, Rath, grid ref: C7110 2805
Stradreagh, Crannog: Rough Island, grid ref: C4720 1942
Strawmore, Standing stone, possible remains of megalithic tomb, grid ref: H7549 9481

T
Tamlaght, Defensive earthwork, grid ref: C6842 3115
Tamlaght (Magilligan), Tamlaghtard Church, saint's grave and holy well, grid ref: C6778 3140
Tamlaght, Standing stone: ‘The Honeymug Stone’, grid ref: H8886 7843
Tamlaght (Coagh), Portal tomb: Cloghtogle, grid ref: H8865 7900
Tamnadeese, Rath, grid ref: H9200 9325
Tamniaran, Rath, grid ref: C7117 0670
Tamnyagan, Standing stone, grid ref: C6338 0336
Teeavan, Reservoir dam: Altnaheglish Reservoir, grid ref: C6960 0412
Templemoyle, Rath, grid ref: C6665 0572
Templemoyle, Church site, grid ref: C6704 0733
Templemoyle, Stone circle/remains of megalithic tomb, grid ref: C6632 0541
Templetown, Church and graveyard: Enagh or Domnach Dola, grid ref: C4687 1955
Templetown (Lough Enagh), Crannog and tower house: Green Island, grid ref: C4737 1942
Terrydreen, Standing stone, grid ref: C6305 0587
Tintagh, Promontory fort, grid ref: H8277 8576
Tireighter, Wedge tomb, grid ref: C5911 0195
Tirnony, Church: Killelagh, grid ref: C8366 0187
Tobermore, Rath, grid ref: H8333 9720
Tully, Anti-Aircraft Operations Room, grid ref: C5096 2064
Tullybrick, Wedge tomb, grid ref: H7473 8950
Tullybrick, Prehistoric field and cairn complex, grid ref: Area of H720 882
Tullybrisland, Cross, grid ref: C5606 2094
Tullynagee, Bivallate rath, grid ref: H8415 8633
Tullynagee, Ringfort Rath, grid ref: H8421 8642

U
Upperland, Rath, grid ref: C8689 0533

References
The main reference for all sites listed is: NI Environment Agency, Scheduled Historic Monuments (to 15 October 2012), unless otherwise indicated.

 
Derry
County Londonderry
Archaeological